New Hampshire's 9th State Senate district is one of 24 districts in the New Hampshire Senate. It has been represented by Republican Denise Ricciardi since 2020, following her defeat of incumbent Democrat Jeanne Dietsch.

Geography
District 9 covers parts of southern Cheshire and Hillsborough Counties outside of Manchester, including the towns of Bedford, Dublin, Fitzwilliam, Greenfield, Hancock, Jaffrey, Lyndeborough, Mont Vernon, New Boston, Peterborough, Richmond, Sharon, Temple, and Troy.

The district includes one municipality (Bedford) from New Hampshire's 1st congressional district; every other municipality is within New Hampshire's 2nd congressional district. It borders the state of Massachusetts.

Recent election results

2020

2018

2016

2014

2012

Federal and statewide results in District 9

References

9
Cheshire County, New Hampshire
Hillsborough County, New Hampshire